Milton Scott Michel (October 23, 1916 – July 8, 1992) was an American crime fiction writer and playwright. His most notable work was published in the 1940s – 1960s.

He attended New York University from 1935–1941, and worked as a technician for a diagnostic x-ray lab in New York City from 1940–1944, after which he became a self-employed writer.

He was a member of the Authors League of America and the Dramatist Guild.

Sometimes credited as M. Scott Michel, Milton Scott, and Scott Michel, and was a writer and editor for the Atlantic Beach Villager and Spotlite.

Bibliography 

 The X-Ray Murders (1942) aka Harlequin #64  as Sinister Warning.
 Sweet Murder (1943) aka Harlequin #42 - The House In Harlem (1950)
 The Psychiatric Murders (1946) aka Murder in the Consulting Room
 The Black Key (1946)
 The Murder Of Me, a three-act play (1961)
 Time To Kill (date unknown)
 A Country Reborn documentary script (1966)

As Milton Scott:

 Dear, Dead Harry (1947).

As Scott Michel:

 Angels Kiss Me, a Broadway play (1951)
 Rise By Sin, a Broadway play (1952)
 Sixth Finger In A Five Finger Glove, a Broadway play (1956), featured music by Charles Strouse
 Journey Into Limbo: A Novel of Intimate Adventure (1962)

Trivia 

Charles Strouse's "Sixth Finger Theme", originally written for the play Sixth Finger In A Five Finger Glove, was used as the original theme music for The Price Is Right from 1956-1961.

References 
Hubin, Allen J. Crime Fiction, 1749-1980: A Comprehensive Bibliography.  New York: Garland, 1984.

External links 
 Milton Scott Michel at the Golden Age of Detection Wiki

1916 births
20th-century American novelists
American male novelists
American mystery writers
Novelists from New York (state)
1992 deaths
20th-century American dramatists and playwrights
American male dramatists and playwrights
20th-century American male writers
New York University alumni